A vertical launching system (VLS) is an advanced system for holding and firing missiles on mobile naval platforms, such as surface ships and submarines. Each vertical launch system consists of a number of cells, which can hold one or more missiles ready for firing. Typically, each cell can hold a number of different types of missiles, allowing the ship flexibility to load the best set for any given mission. Further, when new missiles are developed, they are typically fitted to the existing vertical launch systems of that nation, allowing existing ships to use new types of missiles without expensive rework. When the command is given, the missile flies straight up far enough to clear the cell and the ship, then turns on to the desired course.

A VLS allows surface combatants to have a greater number of weapons ready for firing at any given time compared to older launching systems such as the Mark 13 single-arm and Mark 26 twin-arm launchers, which were fed from behind by a magazine below the main deck. In addition to greater firepower, VLS is much more damage tolerant and reliable than the previous systems and has a lower radar cross-section (RCS). The U.S. Navy now relies exclusively on VLS for its guided missile destroyers and cruisers.

The most widespread vertical launch system in the world is the Mark 41, developed by the United States Navy. More than 11,000 Mark 41 VLS missile cells have been delivered, or are on order, for use on 186 ships across 19 ship classes, in 11 navies around the world. This system currently serves with the US Navy as well as the Australian, Danish, Dutch, German, Japanese, New Zealand, Norwegian, South Korean, Spanish, and Turkish navies, while others like the Greek Navy preferred the similar Mark 48 system.

The older Mark 13 and Mark 26 systems remain in service on ships that were sold to other countries such as Taiwan and Poland.

When installed on an SSN (nuclear-powered attack submarine), a VLS allows a greater number and variety of weapons to be deployed, compared with using only torpedo tubes.

Launch type

A vertical launch system can be either hot launch, where the missile ignites in the cell, or cold launch, where the missile is expelled by gas produced by a gas generator which is not part of the missile itself, and then the missile ignites. "Cold" means relatively cold compared with rocket engine exhaust. A hot launch system does not require an ejection mechanism but does require some way of disposing of the missile's exhaust and heat as it departs the cell. If the missile ignites in a cell without an ejection mechanism, the cell must withstand the tremendous heat generated without igniting missiles in adjacent cells.

Hot launch
An advantage of a hot-launch system is that the missile propels itself out of the launching cell using its own engine, which eliminates the need for a separate system to eject the missile from the launching tube. This potentially makes a hot-launch system relatively light, small, and economical to develop and produce, particularly when designed around smaller missiles. A potential disadvantage is that a malfunctioning missile could destroy the launch tube. American surface-ship VLSs have missile cells arranged in a grid with one lid per cell and are "hot launch" systems. The engine ignites within the cell during the launch and so requires a way of venting rocket exhaust. France, Italy and Britain use a similar hot-launching Sylver system in PAAMS.

Cold launch
The advantage of the cold-launch system is in its safety: should a missile engine malfunction during launch, the cold-launch system can eject the missile, reducing or eliminating the threat. For this reason, Russian VLSs are often designed with a slant so that a malfunctioning missile will land in the water instead of on the ship's deck.  As missile size grows, the benefits of ejection launching increase. Above a certain size, a missile booster cannot be safely ignited within the confines of a ship's hull. Most modern ICBMs and SLBMs are cold-launched. Russia produces both grid systems and a revolver arrangement with more than one missile per lid for its cold launch system. Russia also uses a cold launch system for some of its vertical launch missile systems, e.g., the Tor missile system.

Concentric canister launch
Some warships of China's People's Liberation Army Navy use a concentric canister launch (CCL) system that can launch using both hot and cold methods in the cell module, onboard the Type 052D destroyer and the Type 055 destroyer. The universal launch system is offered for export.

Older Chinese ships use single launch system: Type 052C destroyers, for example, use a cold launch system; Type 054A frigates, a hot launch system.

Other platforms
Transporter erector launchers are wheeled or tracked land vehicles for the launch of surface-to-air and surface-to-surface missiles. In most systems the missiles are transported in a horizontal out-of-battery configuration: in order to fire, the vehicle must stop and the transport/launch tube must be raised to the vertical before firing.

BAE Systems has filed patents relating to the use of Vertical Launch missiles from modified passenger aircraft.

Systems in use by nations

NATO
In 2021, the Centre for Military Studies published the total number of VLS cells in use with fourteen NATO navies. The results are displayed below.

Note: The above table does not include NATO navies which do not possess vertical launching systems, namely Albania, Bulgaria, Croatia, Estonia, Iceland, Latvia, Lithuania, North Macedonia, Poland, Romania and Slovenia.

Other

 El Radii class frigates – Umkhonto (32 cells)

  – Mark 41 Mod 16 (8 cells)
  – Mark 41 (48 cells)
  – Mark 41 (32 cells)

 Tamandaré-class frigate – GWS.35 (12 cells)

  – Mark 48 Mod 1 (16 cells)
 Type 23 frigate –  GWS.26 (32 cells)
  – Mark 41 Mod 16 (8 cells)

Surface
 Type 055 destroyer – Concentric Canister Launch System (112 cells)
 Type 052D destroyer – Concentric Canister Launch System (64 cells)
 Type 052C destroyer – H/AJK03 HHQ-9 (48 cells)
 Type 051C destroyer – 48N6E (48 cells)
 Type 051B destroyer – H/AJK16 HQ-16 or Yu-8 (32 cells)
Sovremenny-class destroyer – H/AJK16 HQ-16 or Yu-8 (32 cells)
 Type 054A frigate – H/AJK16 HQ-16 or Yu-8 (32 cells)

 Tahya Misr (FFG1001) – SYLVER A43 (16 cells)

  – Umkhonto (8 cells)
  – Umkhonto (8 cells)

Surface
  – Barak 1 (16 cells)
  – Barak 1 (24 cells) and Barak 8
  – Barak 8/Barak 1 (32 cells) and BrahMos (16 cells)
  – Barak 1 (32 cells)
  – BrahMos (8 cells) and Barak 1
  – Club or BrahMos (8 cells) and Barak 1 (32 cells)
  – Club or BrahMos (8 cells)
  – Barak 1 (24 cells)
  – Barak 1 (24 cells)
  – Barak 1 (16 cells)
Submarine
  – K-4 or K-15 (8 cells)

 Shahid Soleimani-class corvette – Mehrab (22 cells)
 Zolfaghar-class fast-attack boats – Navvab (4 cells)

 Bung Tomo-class corvette – VL MICA (16 cells)
  – VL MICA (12 cells)
  – Yakhont VLS (4 cells) Ex-

  – Barak 1 (2 x 32 cells)

  – Mark 41 (16 cells)
  – Mark 41 (90 cells)
  – Mark 41 (96 cells)
  – Mark 41 (96 cells)
  – Mark 41 (16 cells) +  Mark 48 (16 cells)
  – Mark 41 (32 cells)
  – Mark 41 (32 cells)
  – Mark 41 (32 cells)
  - Mark 41 (16 cells)
  - Mark 41 (8 cells)

 Lekiu-class frigate - GWS.26 (16 cells)

 Mohammed VI – SYLVER A50 (16 cells)

 Anzac-class frigate – GWS.35 (20 cells)

  – VL MICA (12 cells)

  – Umkhonto 16 cells)

Surface
  – Granit (12 cells) + Kinzhal (192 cells)
  – Granit (20 cells) + Fort/Fort-M (96 cells) + Kinzhal (128 cells)
  – Fort (64 cells)
  – Kinzhal (64 cells)
  – Kinzhal (32 cells)
  – 3S14 for Kalibr or BrahMos (8 cells) + 3S90M for 9M317M (24 cells)
  – 3S14 for Kalibr or Oniks (16 cells) + Redut system for different type of missiles (32 cells)
  – 3S14 for Kalibr or Oniks (8 cells)
  – Redut (12 cells) 
  –  Redut (2 x 8 cells) + 3S14 for Kalibr or Oniks ( 8 cells)
 Buyan-M-class corvette – 3S14 for Kalibr or Oniks (8 cells)
 Karakurt-class corvette – 3S14 for Kalibr or Oniks (8 cells)
 Project 22160E patrol ship – 3S14 for Kalibr or Oniks (8 cells)
 Korsar escort ship – 3S14 for Kalibr (8 cells)
Submarine
 Amur 950 – 3S14 for Kalibr or BrahMos (10 cells)
 Oscar-class submarine – Granit (24 cells) + RPK-2 Vyuga (28 cells)
 Yasen-M – 3S14 for Kalibr (40 cells) or Oniks (32 cells)
 Typhoon-class submarine – R-39 Rif (20 cells)
 Delta III-class submarine – R-29 Vysota (16 cells)
 Delta IV-class submarine – R-29RMU Sineva or R-29RM Shtil (16 cells)
 Borei-class submarine – RSM-56 Bulava (16 cells)

  – SYLVER (32 cells)
  – Barak 1 (2 x 8 cells)

Surface
  (KDX-I) – Mark 48 (16 cells)
  (KDX-II) – Mark 41 (32 cells) + Korean Vertical Launching System (K-VLS) (24 cells / 32 cells)
  (KDX-III) – Mark 41 (80 cells) + K-VLS (48 cells)
  – K-VLS (4 cells)
  – K-VLS (4 cells)
  – K-VLS (16 cells)
Submarine
  – K-VLS (10 cells)

  – Mark 41 (8 cells)
  – Mark 41 (8 cells)

See also
 List of United States Navy Guided Missile Launching Systems
 XM501 Non-Line-of-Sight Launch System An Experimental Small Land and Surface VLS

References

External links

 Mk 41 VLS – Federation of American Scientists
 MK 41 Vertical Launching System (VLS) – GlobalSecurity.org
 Mk-48 Vertical Launching System (VLS) – Seaforces-online Naval Information

Missile launchers
Missile operation
Guided missiles
Missiles
Rockets and missiles
Naval weapons
Soviet inventions
Russian inventions